Germany participated in the Eurovision Song Contest 2012 and selected their entry in a series of competitive heats and a national final Unser Star für Baku, which was organised jointly by the public broadcasters ARD and NDR and the private television channel ProSieben. Roman Lob represented Germany with the song "Standing Still", which placed 8th in the final, scoring 110 points, giving Germany their third top 10 placement in a row.

Before Eurovision

Unser Star für Baku 

Unser Star für Baku (English: Our Star for Baku) was the competition that selected Germany's entry for the Eurovision Song Contest 2012. The competition consisted of eight shows between 12 January and 16 February 2012 all taking place at the Köln-Mülheim Studios in Cologne, hosted by Sandra Rieß and Steven Gätjen. Stefan Raab officially announced his resignation from his roles in the national final, however like in the previous two years, the national final was co-produced by the production company Brainpool, which also co-produced the 2011 Eurovision Song Contest in Düsseldorf. Twenty contestants competed during the shows with the winner being selected through a public televote. The first five shows were broadcast on ProSieben, the quarter-final was broadcast on Das Erste as well as online via ARD's official website daserste.de, the semi-final was broadcast on ProSieben and the final was broadcast on Das Erste and online via daserste.de. The final of the competition was watched by 2.19 million viewers in Germany.

Format
Interested artists were able to apply for the competition by submitting an online application starting on 22 June 2011 or attending a live casting show at the Schanzenstraße 22 in Cologne on 29 September 2011. After submitting an application, artists could present themselves and perform at casting shows that were held in four German cities. The casting shows were held at the Franken Studios in Nuremberg on 5 November 2011, at the Saarländischer Rundfunk Studios in Mannheim on 12 November 2011, at the Delta Musik Park in Essen on 19 November 2011 and at the NDR Studios in Hannover on 26 November 2011. By the end of the process, twenty contestants were selected.

The competition consisted of eight shows. In each of the first two shows on 12 and 19 January 2012, ten contestants performed a cover of a song of their choice and five advanced in the competition. In the third and fourth show on 26 January and 2 February 2012, the remaining contestants performed and two were eliminated per show. In the fifth show on 6 February 2012, one contestant was eliminated, and the top five proceeded to the quarter-final on 9 February 2012. In the quarter-final, the five remaining contestants performed covers of two songs of their choice, and four advanced to the semi-final on 13 February 2012. In the semi-final, the four remaining contestants performed covers of two songs of their choice, and the top two proceeded to the final on 16 February 2012. The final consisted of two rounds. In the first round, the two finalists performed three songs especially written for Eurovision, and one song for each finalist proceeded to the second round. In the second round, the winner was decided from the two combinations of song and artist. During each show, three judges consisting of head judge Thomas D. (singer of the German hip hop band Die Fantastischen Vier), Alina Süggeler (singer of the German band Frida Gold) and Stefan Raab provided feedback in regards to the contestants. Public voting included options for landline and SMS voting. Intermediate results were presented on screen during the shows, which determined the running order of the contestants.

Elimination chart 
Color key:

Shows

Final
The televised final took place on 16 February 2012. The winner was selected through two rounds of public voting. In the first round, the two finalists Ornella de Santis and Roman Lob each performed their versions of "Alone" and "Standing Still" as well as an individual song, and the song for each finalist was determined and proceeded to the second round. In the second round, the winner, "Standing Still" performed by Roman Lob, was selected.

At Eurovision
As a Big Five member, Germany was automatically qualified for the final, held on 26 May. Roman Lob was awarded 110 points in total and finished in 8th place. The public awarded Germany 6th place with 125 points and the jury awarded 10th place with 98 points.

Voting

Points awarded to Germany

Points awarded by Germany

References

External links
Unser Star für Baku – Official site

2012
Countries in the Eurovision Song Contest 2012
Eurovision
Eurovision